Andrée Champagne  (July 17, 1939June 6, 2020) was a Canadian actress, pianist and politician.

Born in Saint-Hyacinthe, Quebec, Champagne was an accomplished performer and personality in her home province. In the 1960s, she became well known on television playing "Donalda" in Claude-Henri Grignon's series Les Belles Histoires des pays d'en haut. After the series ended in 1970, she opened her own casting agency.

She remained active as a performer, but also became involved in cultural issues, serving on the board of directors of l'Institut québécois du cinéma and on the executive of l'Union des artistes in the early 1980s. She also helped create Le Chez Nous des Artistes, a retirement home for artists.

Champagne entered politics as a Progressive Conservative candidate in the 1984 election, and was elected in the Tory landslide as Member of Parliament for Saint-Hyacinthe-Bagot. She was appointed to the Cabinet of Prime Minister Brian Mulroney as Minister of State for Youth.

From 1986 to 1990, she served as Assistant Deputy Chair of the Committee of the Whole House, and became Deputy Speaker of the House of Commons in 1990. She served in that role until her electoral defeat in the 1993 general election. On August 2, 2005, Prime Minister Paul Martin announced the appointment by Governor General Adrienne Clarkson of Champagne as a Conservative member of the Senate of Canada. She retired upon reaching the age of 75 on July 17, 2014.

Champagne died on June 6, 2020 in Saint-Hyacinthe.

References

External links
 
 

1939 births
Canadian senators from Quebec
Canadian television actresses
Women members of the House of Commons of Canada
Women members of the Senate of Canada
Place of death missing
Conservative Party of Canada senators
2020 deaths
French Quebecers
Members of the House of Commons of Canada from Quebec
Members of the Order of Canada
Members of the King's Privy Council for Canada
People from Saint-Hyacinthe
Progressive Conservative Party of Canada MPs
Progressive Conservative Party of Canada senators
Women in Quebec politics
Actresses from Quebec
Canadian actor-politicians
Members of the 24th Canadian Ministry
21st-century Canadian politicians
21st-century Canadian women politicians
20th-century Canadian women politicians
Women government ministers of Canada